This is a list of roads designated N5. Roads entries are sorted in alphabetical order by country.

 N5 (Bangladesh), a Bangladeshi national highway connecting the capital Dhaka and the town of Banglabandha
 N5 road (Belgium), a road connecting Brussels and Philippeville
 N5 road (Democratic Republic of the Congo), a road connecting Bukavu and Uvira
 N5 road (France), a road connecting Dijon and the frontier of Switzerland
 N5 road (Gabon), a road connecting Kougouleu and Bibasse
 N5 road (Ghana), a road connecting Adam and Ho
 N5 road (Ireland), a road connecting Dublin (via the N4) and Westport
 N5 road (Luxembourg)
 N5 highway (Pakistan), a road connecting Karachi and Torkham
 N5 highway (Philippines)
 N5 (Portugal), a road in Portugal
 N5 road (Senegal)
 N5 (South Africa), a road connecting Harrismith and Winburg
 N5 road (Switzerland)
 Nebraska Highway 5, a state highway in the U.S. state of Nebraska

See also
 List of highways numbered 5